Amiya Kumar Kisku (born 14 October 1923, date of death unknown) was an Indian politician and academic. He was elected to the Lok Sabha, lower house of the Parliament of India  from Jhargram constituency in West Bengal. Kisku was also an academic, specialising in the study of indigenous people, particularly the tribes of West Bengal, Bihar, Orissa, and Assam. He later served as the Secretary General of the Indian Confederation of Indigenous and Tribal Peoples (ICITP). In 2007, it was noted that Kisku is deceased.

References

External links
Official biographical sketch in Parliament of India website

1923 births
Year of death missing
India MPs 1967–1970
India MPs 1971–1977
Indian National Congress politicians from West Bengal
Lok Sabha members from West Bengal